Deuba ( is a town in Fiji, located in the Central District and Serua Province, on the island of Viti Levu. According to estimates for the year 2009, it had 1,881 inhabitants.

References 

Populated places in Fiji